On the Sunny Side is an LP album by The Four Lads released by Columbia Records as catalog number CL 912 in 1956, containing mostly popular standard songs.

Track listing

The album, combined with the Four Lads' 1958 album Breezin' Along, was reissued in compact disc form by Collectables Records on January 16, 2001.

The Four Lads albums
1956 albums
Columbia Records albums